Events in the year 2016 in Panama.

Incumbents 
 President: Juan Carlos Varela
 Vice-President: Isabel Saint Malo

Events 
 April 26- Miss Panama 2016 occurs.

 
Panama
2010s in Panama
Years of the 21st century in Panama
Panama